The russetfin topminnow (Fundulus escambiae) is a North American species of temperate freshwater killifish belonging to the genus Fundulus of the family Fundulidae.

References 

Fish described in 1887
Taxa named by Charles Harvey Bollman